Several ships of the Royal Navy have carried the name HMS Orestes, after the mythical son of Agamemnon, who avenged his father's murder:

  was a Dutch-built brig-sloop. She was captured from the Dutch in 1781, taken into Royal Navy service, and disappeared in the Indian Ocean in 1799.
  was a ship sloop of 14 guns, purchased in 1803; her crew burnt her in 1805 to prevent the enemy capturing her. 
  was a sloop, launched on 31 May 1824 and converted into a coal depot in 1852.

Royal Navy ship names